Swedru Sports Stadium is a multi-use stadium in Swedru, Ghana.  It used mostly for football matches and is the home stadium of All Blacks FC.  The stadium holds 5,000 people.

References

Football venues in Ghana